CFED may refer to:

Corporation for Enterprise Development, a non-profit organization in the United States,
CFED-FM, a radio station in Edmonton, Alberta, Canada